Kerem Gürgen is a Turkish amateur boxer in the featherweight (57 kg) division. He is currently a member of the squad at Gençlik Spor İl Müdürlüğü (GSİM) in Siirt.

Career 
Gürgen boxed a gold medal in the featherweight division at the 2009 Mediterranean Games in Pescara, Italy.

At the 3rd World University Championship held between 20 and 27 September 2008 in Kazan, Russia, he gained the silver medal.

References 

Date of birth unknown
Place of birth unknown
People from Siirt
Living people
Featherweight boxers
Turkish male boxers
Mediterranean Games gold medalists for Turkey
Competitors at the 2009 Mediterranean Games
Mediterranean Games medalists in boxing
Year of birth missing (living people)